Rob Simmons (born 19 April 1989 in Theodore, Queensland) is an Australian rugby union footballer. He currently plays for the London Irish in The Premiership in England and represented Australia in international fixtures. His position is lock but he can also play in the backrow.

Early life

Simmons was born in Theodore, Queensland. He attended The Southport School, on the Gold Coast in Queensland, and played for the Australian Schoolboys team in 2006.

Simmons was selected for the Australian U19s representative side in 2007. He played for the Australian Under 20 side at the 2008 IRB Junior World Cup in Wales.

Career

In 2007, Simmons played for the East Coast Aces in the inaugural Australian Rugby Championship. He made his Super Rugby debut for the Queensland Reds in South Africa off the bench against the Bulls at the beginning of the 2009 season.

Simmons made his test rugby debut for Australia in 2010, playing against South Africa in Brisbane.

Simmons scored with a 2nd minute intercept try in Australia's Rugby World Cup 2015 Semi-final win over Argentina. This was the fastest try of the 2015 Rugby World Cup.

On 16 January 2015, Simmons, along with teammate Karmichael Hunt, were appointed vice-captains of the Queensland Reds.

In late 2017, Rob Simmons was axed by the Queensland Reds after playing almost ten years of rugby in Queensland.

In early 2018, Simmons left the Queensland Reds and joined fellow Australian Super Rugby team, the New South Wales Waratahs.

In July 2020, it was announced that Simmons would join English Premiership Rugby side London Irish ahead of the 2020–21 season.

References

External links
Profile at Rugby.com.au
Reds Profile
itsrugby.co.uk profile

1989 births
Australian rugby union players
Australia international rugby union players
Australian expatriate sportspeople in England
Queensland Reds players
Rugby union locks
Living people
People educated at the Southport School
Sportspeople from the Gold Coast, Queensland
Rugby union players from Queensland